Carreira (officially, San Paio de Carreira) is one of the nine parishes (along with Aguiño, Artes, Castiñeiras, Corrubedo, Oleiros, Olveira, Palmeira, and Ribeira) of the municipality of Santa Uxía de Ribeira, Galicia, Spain.

The parish includes the settlements of Agro da Cuña, A Aldea Vella, As Bouzas, Os Buxos, Campos de Abaixo, Campos de Arriba, A Capela, Carreiriña, As Cartas, Casalnovo, Castro, Covelo, O Cruce, A Estrada, A Fieiteira, A Filgueira, Frións, A Graña, A Granxa, Laxes, Liboi, A Mámoa, Montevixán, O Outeiro, Parte ó Río, Pé do Corniño, As Pedriñas, A Pedrosa, O Quinteiro, A Revolta, O Rueiro, Sabartán, Sampaio, Sobreira, O Vilar, and Vixán.

Images of the Parish of Carreira

External links 

Official home page
Municipality of Ribeira Official webpage

Province of A Coruña